Bethany England (born 3 June 1994) is an English professional footballer who plays as a forward for Tottenham Hotspur in the FA WSL and the England national team. She previously played for Doncaster Rovers Belles, Liverpool and Chelsea, and represented England on the U19 and U23 national teams.

In 2020, England was named the league's Player of the Year and PFA Women's Players' Player of the Year after leading Chelsea to win the 2019–20 FA WSL and 2019–20 FA Women's League Cup. She was also named to the PFA Team of the Year.

Early life
England was born and raised with her two sisters in Barnsley, a large market and college town in South Yorkshire, England, between Leeds and Sheffield. She began playing with a boys' team around age six and played with the team for 3–4 years. She was later scouted to join the Sheffield United girls' centre of excellence. After three years with the Sheffield United girls' team, England began playing for the Sheffield United academy at age 13 where she played for three years along with her twin sister, Laura. At 16, England joined Doncaster Belles and broke onto the first team within her first year.

England attended Barnsley Sixth Form College. At Barnsley College, her former football coaches remember her scoring the best goal many of them had ever seen at the Whitsuntide Tournament in Spain. Mark Ryan, manager of the college’s sport academy, noted, "The goalkeeper kicked the ball from the edge of the box. As the ball travelled towards the halfway line, Beth stood wide right. She watched the ball come over her left shoulder and she hit it, first time, from just inside the opposition half. Lobbed the goalkeeper. There were 28 boys on the sideline, and their reaction… It went from stunned silence to absolute uproar.”

England studied law part-time through a partnership with BPP University and the Doncaster Belles organization with the goal of pursuing family law. As a youth, she admired footballers Steven Gerrard and Rachel Yankey.

Club career

Doncaster Rovers Belles

2011–2015

At the age of 17, England established herself in Doncaster Rovers Belles' first team during the second half of the 2011 FA WSL season. She made her debut for the first team on 23 July 2011 and made four appearances during the regular season. Doncaster finished in seventh place with a  record. 
In October 2011, she went on a short-term loan to Sheffield Wednesday.

During the 2012 FA WSL season, England scored two goals in her eight appearances. She scored her first goal during a 3–2 loss to Bristol City. Her second goal came during a 2–0 win over Liverpool. Doncaster finished in seventh place with a  record. Returning to Doncaster England made nine appearances during the 2012 FA WSL season. The team finished in last place and was relegated to the second division, FA WSL 2, for the 2014 season.

She scored a brace against Oxford United. Over her five seasons with Doncaster, England became a regular starter and made close to 100 appearances for the club. Though offered a full-time deal by the Belles, England opted to join Chelsea the following season.

Chelsea

2016–17 season

In January 2016, it was announced that England had signed with reigning FA WSL 1 champions Chelsea for the 2016 season. She scored 5 times in her 19 appearances, including seven starts, playing as a wing-back. Chelsea finished second during the regular season with a  record.

In April 2017, England signed a new two-year contract with Chelsea. A few months later she was loaned to Liverpool for the season where she strengthened her goal-scoring skills with 10 goals in 16 matches.

2017–18 season: Loan to Liverpool
On 14 September 2017, England moved on loan to Liverpool for the 2017–18 FA WSL season. On 12 October 2017, she scored her first goal for the Reds in a 6–0 victory against Sheffield F.C. in the Continental Cup. In February 2018, she scored another goal in Liverpool's 3–1 win against Sunderland. England's 10 goals ranked third on the team for the season. Liverpool finished sixth during the regular season with a  record.

2018–2023: Return to Chelsea and breakthrough
She returned to Chelsea for the  2018–19 FA WSL season. Her 12 goals in 18 matches ranked third in the league and first on Chelsea's squad. Chelsea finished third during the regular season with a  record.

During the 2019–20 FA WSL season, England scored 14 goals in 15 games. Named Player of the Month for January and February, she was the country’s top scorer in all competitions across the top two divisions, and the Super League’s second-highest goalscorer. Her brace during the Continental Cup Final secured Chelsea's win. Chelsea manager Emma Hayes called her the best English No 9 in the country. England scored 21 goals in all competitions for the Women's Super League and Continental Cup and was named the league's Player of the Season.

In July 2020, England signed a new four-year contract with Chelsea. Chelsea's general manager Paul Green noted, "We're delighted to have extended Beth's contract, as she has been outstanding in the last 18 months, playing a big part in the team's success. We feel that she is now coming in to her peak as a player and look forward to seeing how she continues to develop for both club and country in the upcoming years." In August, she helped Chelsea win the 2020 Women's FA Community Shield after a 2–0 win over Manchester City.

Tottenham Hotspur
On 4 January 2023, it was announced that England had signed for Tottenham Hotspur until June 2026. Her transfer fee was reported to be £250,000, breaking the record for a domestic women's football transfer.

International career

Youth
England has represented her country on the under-19, under-23, and senior national teams. In 2012, she competed with the under-19 national team at the UEFA Women's Under-19 Championship in Turkey. She scored two goals in five appearances. The team finished third in their group, but did not advance to the Final Stages.

Senior
In August 2019, England earned her first senior England call up for friendlies against Belgium and Norway. In October 2019, she scored her first goal as a substitute in a 2–1 defeat to Brazil. She scored the game-opening goal in a 3–2 win over Czech Republic an assist from Nikita Parris a month later. In February 2020, she was named to the England squad for the SheBelieves Cup in the United States. England manager Phil Neville said of the call-up, "She's playing in a team full of confidence and every time I see her play, she's added a little bit to the game. Without doubt she, along with Ellen White, are the best two centre-forwards in England on form and she deserves her place in the squad." England made two appearances during the tournament and the team finished third. She sustained an ankle injury during training that prevented her from playing in the team's final match. In June 2022 she was included in the England squad which won the UEFA Women's Euro 2022.

Personal life 
England is openly lesbian, her girlfriend is Stephanie Williams.

Statistics

Club

International
Statistics accurate as of match played 6 September 2022.

As of match played 6 September 2022. England team score listed first, score column indicates score after each Bethany England goal.

Honours

Chelsea
 FA Women's Super League: 2017–18, 2019–20, 2020–21, 2021–22
 FA WSL Spring Series: 2017
 Women's FA Cup: 2017–18, 2021–22
 FA Women's League Cup: 2019–20
 FA Women's Community Shield: 2020

England

UEFA Women's Championship: 2022

Individual
 FA WSL Player of the Year: 2020
PFA Women's Players' Player of the Year: 2019–20
 PFA's WSL Team of the Year: 2020
 FA WSL Player of the Month: January 2020, February 2020
Freedom of the City of London (announced 1 August 2022)

See also 
 List of England women's international footballers
 List of FA WSL hat-tricks

References

External links

Profile  at the Chelsea F.C. website 
Profile at the Football Association website

1994 births
Living people
Lesbian sportswomen
LGBT association football players
English LGBT sportspeople
English women's footballers
Women's association football midfielders
Women's association football forwards
Chelsea F.C. Women players
Doncaster Rovers Belles L.F.C. players
Women's Super League players
Liverpool F.C. Women players
Tottenham Hotspur F.C. Women players
Footballers from Barnsley
England women's international footballers
21st-century LGBT people
UEFA Women's Euro 2022 players
UEFA Women's Championship-winning players